Rosted is a surname. Notable people with the surname include:

Jacob Rosted (1750–1833), Norwegian educator, editor, and librarian
Sigurd Rosted (born 1994), Norwegian footballer

See also
Rosten

Surnames of Norwegian origin
Norwegian-language surnames